With Hopes of Starting Over... is the debut EP from the band The Starting Line, released on June 25, 2001 by Drive-Thru Records. It featured four original songs, two of which later reappeared on their full-length album Say It Like You Mean It, and a cover of Starship's "Nothing's Gonna Stop Us Now".

In November 2005, a sixth song from the recording session surfaced, titled "Song for Her". The acoustic guitar driven song had been cut from the CD for reasons unknown, but was ultimately released online on the band's PureVolume profile.

"Three's a Charm" featured a music video, as well as a music video for "Leaving" recorded during the Say It Like You Mean It album, As well as "Saddest Girl Story" being rerecorded.

Track listing

Personnel
The Starting Line
Mike Golla – Lead guitar, backing vocals
Tom Gryskiewicz – Drums
Kenny Vasoli – Vocals, bass guitar
Matt Watts – Rhythm guitar, backing vocals

Production
Chris Badami – Producer, engineer, mixing
John Paddock – Assistant engineer
Gene Grimaldi – Mastering at Oasis Mastering
Richard Reines, Stefanie Reines – A&R

Artwork
Shawn Corrigan – Band photography
Matt Hanemann – Design & layout

References

External links

With Hopes of Starting Over... at YouTube (streamed copy where licensed)

2001 debut EPs
The Starting Line albums
Drive-Thru Records EPs
Pop punk EPs